Matt's Mood is the 2004 "temporary comeback" album by UK outfit Matt Bianco, released for Universal, and distributed by the Emarcy label. The album makes heavy use of Danny White and Basia Trzetrzelewska's signature harmonies. The two rejoined the band after twenty years (only to leave shortly after the end of the promotional world tour to revitalise their own career under the joint name of Basia). The third member on this installation of Matt Bianco is vocalist and composer Mark Reilly, whom many identify as the face of the band, being the only one constant member since its inception in 1983. This album attempted to sound similar to Whose Side Are You On?, which spawned a number of popular hit singles in the 1980s.

Among the songs on the new album is "Ronnie's Samba", a collage of material by the late Ronnie Ross, a legendary baritone saxophonist, who also played on early Matt Bianco material.  The group received permission from Ross' family to utilize some old recordings of Ross' sax playing and weave them into an entirely new tune.

Track listing 
"Ordinary Day" - 4:38
"I Never Meant to" - 4:52
"Wrong Side of the Street" - 4:04
"La Luna" - 4:04
"Say the Words" - 3:42
"Golden Days" - 4:21
"Ronnie's Samba" - 4:11
"Kaleidoscope" - 4:25
"Slip & Sliding" - 4:20
"Matt's Mood III" - 5:33

Release details

2004 albums
Matt Bianco albums
EmArcy Records albums